Alexandrovka is a rural locality (a village) in Kandrinsky Selsoviet, Tuymazinsky District, Bashkortostan, Russia. The population was 62 as of 2010. There is 1 street.

Geography 
Alexandrovka is located 31 km southeast of Tuymazy (the district's administrative centre) by road. Pervomayskoye is the nearest rural locality.

References 

Rural localities in Tuymazinsky District